Sir John Spencer (15248 November 1586) was an English nobleman, politician, knight, sheriff, landowner, and Member of Parliament. He was an early member of the Spencer family.

Life and family 
Spencer was the son of Sir William Spencer of Wormleighton Manor, Warwickshire, and Althorp, Northamptonshire, and his wife Susan Knightley, daughter of Sir Richard Knightley of Fawsley, Northamptonshire. He was probably trained in law at the Middle Temple and succeeded his father in 1532. He was knighted in 1553.

He was appointed Sheriff of Northamptonshire for 1551–52, 1558–59, 1571–72 and 1583–84. He was elected as a Knight of the Shire (MP) for Northamptonshire in April 1554, and again in 1558.

Marriage and issue 
Spencer married, by 1545, Katherine Kitson, the daughter of Sir Thomas Kitson of the City of London and of Hengrave Hall, Suffolk. They had five sons and six daughters, including

 Sir John Spencer (died 1600), who succeeded to his father's estates at Wormleighton and Althorp 
 Elizabeth Spencer, Baroness Hunsdon
 Alice Spencer, who married Ferdinando Stanley, 5th Earl of Derby. Their daughter Anne (1580–1647) was heiress presumptive to the English throne upon the death of Elizabeth I according to the will of Henry VIII and the Third Succession Act. As Countess of Derby, Alice was a noted patron of the arts. The poet Edmund Spenser represented her as the character "Amaryllis" in his eclogue Colin Clouts Come Home Againe (1595) and she was the dedicatee of his poem The Teares of the Muses (1591).
 Sir William Spencer, the third son, who became a landowner in Yarnton, Oxfordshire. His son Thomas was Member of Parliament for Woodstock 1604-1611, and was created Baronet of Yarnton on 29 June 1611 in the Baronetage of England. 
 Sir Richard Spencer, the fourth son, whose son John was a landowner in Offley Place, Great Offley, Hertfordshire, and was created Baronet of Offley on 14 March 1627 in the Baronetage of England.
Anne Spencer, who made three notable marriages, the third being to Robert Sackville, 2nd Earl of Dorset
Mary Spencer, who  married  Sir  Edward Aston.

Sir John Spencer died on 8 November 1586, and was buried with his wife Katherine Kitson in St Mary the Virgin Church, Great Brington (the parish church for Althorp) where his epitaph lists his sons, his daughters and their husbands. He was succeeded by his eldest son, Sir John Spencer (died 1600).

Notes

References

1524 births
1586 deaths
People from Warwickshire
John
High Sheriffs of Northamptonshire
English MPs 1554
English MPs 1558